Nadbai railway station is a railway station in Bharatpur district, Rajasthan. Its code is NBI. It serves Nadbai. The station consists of 2 platforms. Passenger, Superfast trains halt here.

References

Railway stations in Bharatpur district
Agra railway division